The 1968–69 season was the 85th football season in which Dumbarton competed at a Scottish national level, entering the Scottish Football League, the Scottish Cup and the Scottish League Cup.  In addition Dumbarton competed in the Stirlingshire Cup.

Scottish Second Division

Another poor start to a league season, with a single win and a draw from the first eight matches, resulted in the sacking of manager Ian Spence.  His replacement, Jackie Stewart took charge on 1 December, and although results were to improve, nonetheless Dumbarton finished in a disappointing 14th place, with 27 points, 37 behind champions Motherwell.

Scottish League Cup

In the League Cup, two wins from the six sectional games were never going to be enough to qualify for the knock out stages of the competition.

Scottish Cup

In the Scottish Cup, Dumbarton scrapped past non-league Vale of Leithen in the second preliminary round, but were not disgraced in their single goal defeat to First Division opponents St Mirren in the first round proper.

Stirlingshire Cup
Locally, in the Stirlingshire Cup Dumbarton lost in the first round to East Stirling.

Friendlies
Dumbarton undertook a 'mini' pre-season tour across the border - the first games played in England by the club for almost a decade.

Player statistics

Squad 

|}

Source:

Transfers
Amongst those players joining and leaving the club were the following:

Players in

Players out 

Source:

References

Dumbarton F.C. seasons
Scottish football clubs 1968–69 season